Goran Šaula (born 1 September 1970) is a Serbian former professional footballer who played as a defender.

Club career
During his 10-year-long career, Šaula played for Vojvodina (1990–1996) and Compostela (1996–2000).

International career
At international level, Šaula was capped nine times for FR Yugoslavia from 1994 to 1996.

References

External links
 
 
 
 

1970 births
Living people
Footballers from Novi Sad
Yugoslav footballers
Serbia and Montenegro footballers
Serbian footballers
Association football defenders
Serbia and Montenegro international footballers
FK Vojvodina players
SD Compostela footballers
Yugoslav First League players
First League of Serbia and Montenegro players
La Liga players
Segunda División players
Serbia and Montenegro expatriate footballers
Expatriate footballers in Spain
Serbia and Montenegro expatriate sportspeople in Spain